The war-responsibility trials in Finland were trials of the Finnish wartime leaders held responsible for "definitely influencing Finland in getting into a war with the Soviet Union and United Kingdom in 1941 or preventing peace" during the Continuation War, the Finnish term for their participation in the Second World War from 1941–1944. Unlike other World War II war-responsibility trials, the Finnish trials were not international. The trials were conducted from November 1945 through February 1946 by a special court consisting of the presidents of the Supreme Court of Finland, the Supreme Administrative Court of Finland, a professor from the University of Helsinki and twelve MPs appointed by the Parliament of Finland.   The accused were convicted and were imprisoned until they were eventually paroled and then pardoned.

Background
The Moscow Armistice, signed September 19, 1944, contained the following  Article 13:

The Finns initially thought that the trials would be for conventional war crimes. However, as the Moscow Declaration of October 30, 1943 made clear, the Allied powers intended to prosecute for other actions as well.

The Allied Control Commission and the Communist Party of Finland raised the issue of the trials repeatedly during the spring and summer of 1945. When the Treaty of London (London Charter) August 8, 1945 defined three types of crimes, war crimes, crimes against peace and crimes against humanity, it became evident that Finland could not be the only country fighting on the German side where leaders would not be convicted. On September 11, the parliament passed a law enabling prosecution of those responsible for war. The Supreme Court of Finland and leading judicial experts protested the law as conflicting with the constitution of Finland and contrary to Western judicial principles (it was designed to apply retroactively), but they did not comment on the political necessity of it. The Finnish public regarded it as a mockery of the rule of law. Juho Kusti Paasikivi, who was the prime minister of Finland at the time, is known to have stated that the conditions of the armistice concerning this matter disregarded all laws.

The trial
The trials were conducted in Finland under Finnish (retroactive) law with Finnish judges. The law limited criminal liability to the highest leadership; only politicians and the Finnish war-time ambassador in Berlin, Toivo Mikael Kivimäki, were prosecuted.  The consolidated trial started on November 15, 1945. The Allied Control Commission, which monitored the implementation of the armistice on behalf of the Allies, set up a committee to observe the trials and interfered on numerous occasions before the trials ended in February 1946.

The accused

 
On the negotiations between the leadership of the Communist Party of Finland and Andrei Zhdanov, the chairman of Allied Control Commission the question of removal of Väinö Tanner, the chairman of the Social Democratic Party, was raised. In his private notes Zhdanov wrote: "If Tanner is removed, the Social Democratic Party will shatter..." thus opening the road to Communist control of the left.

Reactions to the trial
Most Finns rejected the legitimacy of the trial, because ex post facto law was against the Finnish Constitution, and because only Finnish leaders, and not the Soviet leaders who had ordered the invasion of Finland in 1939, were held accountable for the charge of aggressive war. The lack of public support for the proceedings led to the Finnish government paroling  and pardoning each of the defendants who was sentenced to imprisonment. 

The question as to whether Finnish officials had known about the extermination of the Jews, in the course of their collaboration with Nazi Germany, was not raised in the trial. While Finland managed to prevent the deportation and murder of almost all of its Jews during the war, the question as to whether the Finnish state knew about the Holocaust continues to be controversial inside the country. 

President Paasikivi complained to his aide that the convictions handed down in the Trials were one of the biggest stumbling blocks to improving relations between Finland and the Soviet Union.

Aftermath

After the Paris Peace treaty was ratified in the Soviet Union August 29, 1947, the Allied Control Commission left Finland on September 26, 1947. President Paasikivi paroled Kukkonen and Reinikka in October and Ramsay in December when they had served five-sixths of their sentences. The rest were granted parole in accordance with Finnish criminal law when they had served half of their sentences. On May 19, 1949 Paasikivi pardoned Ryti, who was hospitalized (his health collapsed during the imprisonment and he remained an invalid until his death in 1956). He also pardoned Rangell, Tanner, Linkomies, and Kivimäki, who were still on parole. That day, Paasikivi wrote in his diary: "[It was] ... the most noble deed, I have participated in, in the last five years."

See also

 Crime against peace
Kellogg–Briand Pact, a treaty of international law renouncing war signed by Finland.
 Nuremberg trials
 Nuremberg principles

Footnotes

References
 Jakobson, Max (former Finnish Ambassador to the UN); Finnish wartime leaders on trial for "war guilt" 60 years ago Helsingin Sanomat International edition, 28 October 2005
 Meinander, Henrik: Finlands Historia. Part 4 pp. 279–282, 
 Rautkallio, Hannu: Sotasyyllisyysnäytelmä, Savonlinnan Kirjapaino Oy, 1981
 Rosendahl, Anja & Saija, Olavi: Ajasta Aikaan – Suomen historian käännekohtia (Turning points in Finland's history), WSOY 1995
 Tallgren, Immi. "The Finnish War-Responsibility Trial in 1945-46: The Limits of ad hoc Criminal Justice?." in The Hidden Histories of War Crimes Trials (Oxford University Press, 2013. 430-454).
 Tallgren, Immi. "Martyrs and Scapegoats of the Nation? The Finnish War-Responsibility Trial, 1945–1946." Historical Origins of International Criminal Law (Torkel Opsahl Academic EPublisher, 2014) pp. 493–538. 
 Turtola, Martti: Risto Ryti: Elämä isänmaan puolesta, Otava, 1994

Further reading
 Lehtinen, Lasse;  and Rautkallio, Hannu; Kansakunnan sijaiskärsijät ("Scapegoats of the Nation"), WSOY 2005
 Tarkka, Jukka; Nobody wanted a cell near Edwin Linkomies  Helsingin Sanomat International edition, 28 October 2005  
 Wuorinen, John H. (1948), ed., Finland and World War  II, 1939–1944'', New York:  Roland Press.

Trials in Finland
Legal history of Finland
Crime of aggression
Finland–Soviet Union relations
1945 in Finland
1945 in case law
World War II war crimes trials
Ex post facto case law